MacKillop Catholic Regional College is a Catholic secondary school in Werribee, Victoria, Australia. It has strong connections to the Josephite sisters, founded by Mary MacKillop. The college was founded as Mary McKillop Girls College in 1970, providing junior secondary education to female students in Years 7, 8 and 9. As demand for secondary education grew in the area, the College expanded to cater to male and female students from Years 7 to 12 and changed its name to reflect these changes. Mackillop recently hit 50 years since opening which lead to celebrations but was cut short due to covid-19 epidemic, but was able to thoroughly maintain classes throughout lockdown with the use of Zoom Video Communications and only having certain year levels be at the school at a time.

Curriculum
Senior students may study Victorian Certificate of Education (VCE) units, Vocational Education and Training, and Victorian Certificate of Applied Learning (VCAL) Certificate courses. The college offers flexible VCE programs with students able to undertake VCE units from Year 10 and study first year university subjects during Year 12.

Co-curriculum
The co-curricular program at MacKillop Catholic Regional College includes tennis, swimming and athletics carnivals, external subject-based competitions and an annual musical. The College is a member of the Sports Association of Catholic Co-educational Secondary Schools (SACCSS), the Victorian Secondary Schools Sports Association and the Catholic All Schools, within which students participate in a variety of sporting competitions. The college also offers tuition in singing and various musical instruments, and students have the opportunity to take exams with the Australian Music Examinations Board.

MacKillop offers its students various chances to interact with students from different schools in other countries, which involve Japan, France and Italy.

The four houses and their associated colours are:
 Chisolm (green)
 Flinders (blue)
 Knox (yellow)
 Cook (red)
 
The houses compete in the annual sporting carnivals.
However, annual sporting events are optional for students.

Notable alumni
Danny Tiatto, ex-Premier League football player who played for Manchester City, Leicester City and the Australian national soccer team
Brent Prismall, ex-AFL player for the Essendon Football Club and Geelong Football Club.
Anthony Callea, runner-up of Australian Idol.
Joanne Ryan, Federal Member for Lalor and Opposition Whip for the Australian Labor Party, Parliament of Australia
Marny Kennedy, actress, most notably for her role as Taylor Fry in Mortified. Also starred in season of Saddle Club, and in the series Conspiracy 365.
Jack Fitzpatrick, ex-AFL player for the Melbourne Football Club and Hawthorn Football Club
Majak Daw, AFL player for the North Melbourne Football Club
Mark Bonanno, writer and performer in sketch comedy troupe Aunty Donna.

See also 
 List of schools in Victoria
 MacKillop College, a list of schools named in honor of Mary MacKillop

Notes

Catholic secondary schools in Melbourne
Educational institutions established in 1970
Schools in Wyndham
1970 establishments in Australia
Werribee, Victoria